Lawrence is an English-language surname. Notable people with the surname include:

A–D 
 Abbott Lawrence (1792–1855), a noted merchant and founder of Lawrence, Massachusetts
 Abbott Lawrence, US representative from Massachusetts
 Abraham Riker Lawrence (1832–1917), New York Supreme Court Justice
 Allan Lawrence (politician) (1925–2008), Ontario provincial MPP and federal MP
 Alonzo Lawrence (born 1989), American football player
 Amos Adams Lawrence (1814–1886), abolitionist and founder of the University of Kansas
 Amos Lawrence (1786–1852), Massachusetts philanthropist and politician
 Andrew Lawrence (disambiguation)
 Bert Lawrence (1923–2007), Ontario provincial MPP
 Bill Lawrence (TV producer), American screenwriter and the creator of Scrubs
 Brenton Lawrence (born 1984), Australian Rugby League player
 Brian Lawrence (born 1976), American baseball pitcher
 Bruno Lawrence (1941–1995), New Zealand actor and musician
 Carmen Lawrence (born 1948), Australian politician
 Carol Lawrence (born 1932), American actress most often associated with musical theatre
 Carolyn Lawrence (born 1967), American voice actress
 Casey Lawrence (born 1987), American baseball pitcher
 Charles Lawrence (British Army officer) (1709–1760), British military officer and later governor of Nova Scotia
 Chris Lawrence (rugby league) (born 1988), Australian Rugby League player
 Christopher Lawrence (disambiguation)
 Claudia Lawrence, disappeared in York, England in 2009
 Cornelius Van Wyck Lawrence (1791–1861), Mayor of New York City, and US Congressman
 Curly Lawrence (1883–1967), British model engineer
 Cyril Lawrence (1920–2020), English footballer 
 D. H. Lawrence (1885–1930), English author
 Davey Lawrence (born 1985), English ice hockey goaltender
 David Lawrence (disambiguation)
 David Lawrence (cricketer) (born 1964), English cricketer
 Debbi Lawrence (born 1961), American racewalker
 Derek Lawrence, English record producer
 Dexter Lawrence (born 1997), American football player
 Don Lawrence (1928–2003), British comic book artist
 Dorothy Bell Lawrence (1911–1973), New York assemblywoman
 Doug Lawrence (jazz) (born 1956), jazz saxophonist with Count Basie Orchestra
 Doug Lawrence, a comic and voice talent
 Douglas Lawrence, Australian organist, conductor, and choir director

E–J 
 Edith Lawrence (1890–1973), British artist
 Edward A. Lawrence (1831–1883), New York politician
 Effingham Lawrence (1820–1878), US Congressman from Louisiana
 Ellis F. Lawrence, architect and founder of the School of Architecture and Allied Arts at the University of Oregon
 Ernest O. Lawrence (1901–1958), Nobel Prize-winning physicist: best known for inventing the cyclotron, and his later work in the Manhattan Project
 Eugene Lawrence (born 1986), American basketball player
 Fenda Lawrence, 18th-century slave trader
 Florence Lawrence (1886–1938), inventor and silent film actress from Hamilton, Ontario
 Frances Lawrence (disambiguation)
 Francis Lawrence (disambiguation)
 Frederick William Lawrence (1892–1974), Canadian–American airbrush painter
 Frederick Newbold Lawrence (1834–1916), American president of the New York Stock Exchange
 Gaylon Lawrence (1934–2012), American businessman and farmer
 Geoffrey Lawrence (disambiguation)
 George Alfred Lawrence (1827–1876), English novelist
 George Newbold Lawrence (1806–1895), American businessman and amateur ornithologist
 George P. Lawrence, former U.S. Representative from Massachusetts
 George St. Patrick Lawrence (1804–1884), English soldier
 George Van Eman Lawrence (1818–1904), member of the United States House of Representatives from Pennsylvania
 Gertrude Lawrence (1898–1952), English actress and musical comedy performer
 Hal Lawrence (1920–1994), Canadian naval officer, historian and author
 Henry Arnold Lawrence (1848–1902), English rugby union player
 Henry Montgomery Lawrence (1806–1857) British soldier
 Herbert Lawrence (1861–1943) British soldier
 Holly Lawrence (born 1990), British triathlete
 Iain Lawrence (born 1978), British film director and screenwriter
 Jacob Lawrence (1917–2000), American painter known for "dynamic cubism" style
 Jacqueline Lawrence (canoeist), (born 1982), Australian slalom canoeist
 James Lawrence (born 1992), English footballer
 James Lawrence (1781–1813), American naval captain and hero of the War of 1812
 Jennifer Lawrence (born 1990), American actress
 Jennifer Lawrence (Stop the Steal), political activist
 Joey Lawrence (born 1976), American comic actor
 John Hundale Lawrence, a nuclear medicine pioneer, brother of Ernest O. Lawrence 
 John L. Lawrence (1785–1849), New York politician
 John Lawrence, 1st Baron Lawrence (1811–79), British statesman
 Joseph Lawrence (Pennsylvania politician) (1786–1886), member of the United States House of Representatives from Pennsylvania
 Josie Lawrence (born 1959), English actress and comedian
 Justin Lawrence (disambiguation), several people

K–S 
 Katrina Lawrence, (born 1983), Australian slalom canoeist
 Lawrence (1831 cricketer), an English cricketer whose first name is not known
 Liam Lawrence (born 1981), English-born Irish footballer
 Liz Lawrence, English singer-songwriter and guitarist
 Margaret Morgan Lawrence (1914-2019), American psychiatrist
 Martin Lawrence (born 1965), American actor and comedian
 Mary Lawrence (actor) (1918–1991), American film and television actress and author
 Mary Lawrence (sculptor) (1868–1945), American sculptor
 Matthew Lawrence, (born 1974), English footballer
 Michael Lawrence (disambiguation)
 Mike Lawrence (bridge) (born 1940), American bridge player
 Mr. Lawrence (born 1969), American actor
 Nathaniel Lawrence (1761–1797), New York politician
 Patrice Lawrence, British writer and journalist
 Peter Lawrence (disambiguation), several people
 Philip Lawrence (1947–1995), murdered headmaster of St. George's Roman Catholic School
 Rashard Lawrence (born 1998), American football player
 R. D. Lawrence, Canadian naturalist and writer
 Reginald Frederick Lawrence, South African entomologist
 Robert Henry Lawrence Jr. (1935–1967) the first Black American astronaut and member of the proposed Manned Orbiting Laboratory program of the U.S. Air Force
 Rosalyn Lawrence (born 1989), Australian slalom canoeist
 Sally Ward Lawrence Hunt Armstrong Downs, also known as Sallie Ward, (1827–1896), American socialite.
 Samuel Lawrence (disambiguation)
 Samuel Lawrence (congressman) (1773–1837), New York politician
 Samuel Lawrence (Canadian politician) (1879–1959), Canadian politician
 Scott Lawrence (born 1963), American film and television actor and voice of Darth Vader in Star Wars video games
 Sharon Lawrence (born 1961), American television actress
 Murder of Stephen Lawrence
 Steve Lawrence (born 1935), American singer, comedian, and actor
 Stringer Lawrence (1697–1775), English soldier
 Syd Lawrence, British bandleader and founder of the Syd Lawrence Orchestra big band

T–Z 
 T. E. Lawrence (1888–1935), British soldier and author ("Lawrence of Arabia")
 Tayna Lawrence (born 1975), Jamaican athlete
 Thomas Lawrence (1769–1830), English portrait painter
 Tommy Lawrence (1940–2018), Scottish footballer
 Toni Lawrence (born 1976), convicted of criminal confinement in the torture-murder of Shanda Sharer
 Tracy Lawrence (born 1968), American country singer and musician
 Trevor Lawrence (born 1999), American football player
 Trevor Lawrence (disambiguation), several other people
 Vicki Lawrence (born 1949), American actress, singer, and comedian
 Washington H. Lawrence (1840–1900), founder of National Carbon Company
 Wendell Lawrence (born 1967), Bahamian triple jumper
 William Lawrence (disambiguation)
 William Appleton Lawrence, 3rd Bishop of the Episcopal Diocese of Western Massachusetts
 William Lawrence (biologist) (1783–1867), English surgeon and natural historian, a pre-Darwinian advocate of anthropoid origin of mankind
 William Lawrence (bishop), the 7th Bishop of the Episcopal Diocese of Massachusetts
 William Lawrence (Ohio Democrat), member of the United States House of Representatives from the 17th District of Ohio
 William Lawrence (Ohio Republican), Republican politician from Ohio
 William P. Lawrence (1930–2005), United States naval officer
 William Witherle Lawrence (1876–1936), American philologist

Fictional characters
Carrie and Jack Lawrence, characters in the 1997 American comedy movie Fathers' Day
Eula Lawrence, playable character in the 2020 video game Genshin Impact

See also 
 Laurence (disambiguation)
 Lawrance (disambiguation)
 Lawrence (given name)
 Lawrence (disambiguation)
 Laurance

English-language surnames
Surnames from given names